The Practice of Love is a 1985 West German-Austrian drama film written by and directed by Valie Export. It was entered into the 35th Berlin International Film Festival.

Cast
 Adelheid Arndt as Judith Wiener
 Rüdiger Vogler as Dr. Alfons Schlögel
 Hagnot Elischka as Dr. Josef Frischkoff
 Franz Kantner as Reinhard Flegel
 Paul Müller as French Industrialist
 Kurt Radlecker as Police officer
 Adolf Lukan as Head of the Police
 Guenther Nenning as Chief TV Editor
 Wolfgang Böck as First Arms Smuggler
 Jürgen Lier as Businessman
 Traute Furthner as Flegel's Mother
 Paul Muehlhauser as Concierge in Vienna
 Marion Bockmann as Peepshow-Girl
 Liane Wagner as Frau Schlögel
 Gary Indiana as American

References

External links

1985 films
1980s German-language films
1985 drama films
Films directed by Valie Export
Austrian drama films